MightySat-1 was a small spacecraft developed by the U.S. Air Force's Phillips Laboratory (now part of the Air Force Research Laboratory Space Vehicles Directorate) to test technology for small satellites, including advanced dual-junction solar cells, a composite structure, a micrometeorite and debris detector, low-power electronics and a low-shock release device. The 140-pound satellite was launched from the Space Shuttle Endeavour in December 1998, during the 12th day of the STS-88 mission and performed robustly in orbit, with no spacecraft anomalies during its mission. Lt. Barbara Braun of the AFRL was the program manager for the satellite.

MightySat-1's mission ended when it re-entered the atmosphere at 17:11 UTC on November 21, 1999.

References 

Spacecraft launched by the Space Shuttle
Spacecraft launched in 1998
Spacecraft which reentered in 1999